The Basilica of Saint Mary of Coro is a baroque Roman Catholic parish church and minor basilica completed in 1774. It is located in the "Parte Vieja" (Old Town) of the city of San Sebastián, Gipuzkoa, Basque Country, Spain.

Interior
The main nave consists of a large space of  divided into three naves, which in turn can be divided into 4 zones having as axis the pillars of the nave. Six pillars and the walls with pillars act as a buttress supporting the vaults. At the end of the nave, on the right side, different rooms are used by the parish and other services: daily chapel, sacristy  and storage rooms.

Exterior
The main entrance is located between the two towers and looks as an altarpiece with its tortured figure of Saint Sebastian and the papal symbols that prove the status of minor basilica. The shield of the city crowns the building.

Gallery

See also
Catholic Church in Spain

Notes

External links

 Basilica of Saint Mary of Coro

San Sebastián
18th-century Roman Catholic church buildings in Spain
Roman Catholic churches completed in 1774
Churches in the Basque Country (autonomous community)
Basilica churches in Spain
Baroque architecture in the Basque Country (autonomous community)